Williams Creek is a stream in Clay County in the U.S. state of Missouri. It is a tributary of the Fishing River.

Williams Creek has the name of Ellis Williams, a pioneer citizen.

See also
List of rivers of Missouri

References

Rivers of Clay County, Missouri
Rivers of Missouri